Alyssa Paola Thompson (born November 7, 2004) is an American soccer player who plays as a forward for Angel City FC and the United States national team.

Club career
At the age of 13, Thompson was playing with players four years older than her. In April 2021, she was named Gatorade girls' soccer national player of the year.

She played for Harvard-Westlake School scoring 48 goals in 18 games.

She played for Total Futbol Academy's under-19 team at the age of 17, in the MLS Next league, and was the only female player in the league.

Thompson signed a commitment with Stanford University at the age of 15.

On January 12, 2023, Angel City FC of the National Women's Soccer League selected Thompson with the first overall pick in the 2023 NWSL Draft.

International career
Thompson played for the U.S. under-20s, winning a gold medal in the 2022 CONCACAF Women's U-20 Championship, playing in five matches and scoring three goals, and in the 2022 FIFA U-20 Women's World Cup, playing in three matches and scoring one goal.

She was called up to the senior squad in September 2022, being the youngest player since Sophia Smith in 2017.

Personal life
Thompson is of Filipino and Peruvian descent.

She has two younger sisters, Gisele and Zoe; Gisele is also a soccer player. Alyssa and Gisele (USWNT-U-17 member) both signed a deal with Nike, becoming the first high school athletes to sign a name, image, and likeness deal with the brand.

Thompson also runs track, and in April 2022 ran 100m in 11.74 seconds, which is the second fastest 100m sprint in California.

Career statistics

Honors and awards

International

United States U20

CONCACAF Women's U-20 Championship: 2022

References

2004 births
Living people
American women's soccer players
Women's association football forwards
United States women's under-20 international soccer players
United States women's international soccer players
Harvard-Westlake School alumni
American sportspeople of Filipino descent
American sportspeople of Peruvian descent
Angel City FC draft picks
Angel City FC players